The 2018–19 season was Olympique Lyonnais's 69th professional season since its establishment in 1950. The side competed in Ligue 1, Coupe de France, Coupe de la Ligue and UEFA Champions League.

Players

Squad information
As of 31 August 2018

Out on loan

Transfers

In:

Out:

Pre-season and friendlies

Friendlies

International Champions Cup

Competitions

Overall

Ligue 1

League table

Results summary

Results by round

Matches

Coupe de France

Coupe de la Ligue

UEFA Champions League

On 30 August, Lyon were drawn in Group F of the Champions League alongside Manchester City, Shakhtar Donetsk, and Hoffenheim.

Group stage

Knockout phase

Round of 16

Statistics

Appearances and goals

|-
! colspan=14 style=background:#dcdcdc; text-align:center| Goalkeepers

|-
! colspan=14 style=background:#dcdcdc; text-align:center| Defenders

|-
! colspan=14 style=background:#dcdcdc; text-align:center| Midfielders

|-
! colspan=14 style=background:#dcdcdc; text-align:center| Forwards

|-
! colspan=14 style=background:#dcdcdc; text-align:center| Players transferred out during the season

Goalscorers

Last updated: 24 May 2019

References

Lyon
Lyon
Olympique Lyonnais seasons